Verusco Technologies is a company based in Palmerston North, New Zealand. They supply video analysis software and statistics to rugby union teams, including the Super Rugby franchise the Blue Bulls, most South African professional teams and other teams in France, Japan, and Australia.

While involved with analysis of the 2007 Rugby World Cup, they discovered that the New Zealand national rugby union team, the "All Blacks", made 57 tackles to Frances' 269, and they had 66 percent possession and 60 percent territory. The playing time, or the time the ball was in play, was the longest of any game Verusco had ever recorded.

The company has analysed 1,500 games since 2000.

References

External links

Rugby union in New Zealand
Sports software
Software companies of New Zealand